Wickersham House may refer to any of the following residences of James Wickersham.  Wickersham lived in these houses from 1900 until his death in 1939:

 Wickersham House (Eagle, Alaska), part of the Eagle Historic District, listed on the National Register of Historic Places in Southeast Fairbanks Census Area, Alaska
 Wickersham House (Fairbanks, Alaska), listed on the National Register of Historic Places in Fairbanks North Star Borough, Alaska
 Wickersham House (Juneau, Alaska), listed on the National Register of Historic Places in Juneau, Alaska